Oatly Group AB is a Swedish food company that produces alternatives to dairy products from oats.  Oatly was formed in the 1990s using research from Lund University. Oatly has headquarters in Malmö and a production and development center in Landskrona. Oatly's key markets are Sweden, Germany and the UK, and its products were available in 60,000 retail stores and 32,200 coffee shops around the world as of 31 December 2020. Oatly is available in 11,000 coffee and tea shops in China, and at more than 6,000 retail and specialty shops across the US, including thousands of Starbucks locations.

History

Oatly was founded in 1993 or 1994 by food scientist Rickard Öste and his brother Björn Öste. The parent company of Oatly AB is Ceba AB, which was founded by Rickard Öste, Ingegerd Sjöholm, Inger Ahlden and Lennart Lindahl together with the cereals company Skånska Lantmännen on February 17, 1994 Oatly Group changed its name from Havre Global AB on 1 March 2021.

Oatly is now part-owned by The Blackstone Group (7%), Verlinvest, China Resources (a conglomerate owned by the Chinese state), Industrifonden, Östersjöstiftelsen, and the employees. The group also included celebrities such as Oprah Winfrey and Jay-Z, as well as Starbucks founder Howard Schultz.

In 2018 the company was publicly criticized for supporting a local pig farm to which it sold the residue of its manufacturing process. The company said it would "re-visit the issue."

In 2020, Oatly's sale of a US$200-million stake to investors including the Blackstone Group, which has financed companies driving extensive deforestation in the Amazon, as well as driving road development into the depths of the jungle for export of foodstuffs, angered consumers and led to a backlash against the company.

In 2021, Oatly applied to be listed on the Nasdaq under the ticker symbol "OTLY". When the company set terms for its initial public offering, its potential value was estimated at more than $10 billion. Morgan Stanley, J.P. Morgan and Credit Suisse were the underwriters. OTLY stock was priced at $17 but had its first public trade at $22.12 on the first day.

On July 14, 2021, short seller Spruce Point Capital published a report questioning Oatly's management and sustainability. Spruce Point alleged that Oatly overstated revenue and margins, among other accounting issues, and accused the company of green washing for understating water usage, and for not having a waste-water treatment facility. After the announcement Oatly's stock briefly went below IPO, resulting in several class-action lawsuits. Glenn Vanzura of Mayer Brown stated that it is common in other industries that after a short-seller targets a company to drive down stock price, a class action lawsuit is filed, noting that such lawsuits are often dismissed.

Oatly took a small British firm, Glebe Farm Foods, to court, alleging it had infringed Oatly's trademark by selling cartons of an oat-based drink called "PureOaty". In August 2021, the judge dismissed Oatly's case at London's High Court, concluding there was only a "very modest level of similarity" between the Glebe Farm branding and Oatly's.

Products

Oatly has a range of products including: oat milk, ice cream, cold coffee, yoghurt substitutes, cooking cream, spread, custard and mayonnaise. All products are certified kosher and vegan and are non-GMO project verified. All US Oatly products are certified gluten free. However, in Europe and Asia, Oatly's products are not gluten free.

In the US, Oatly's oat beverages, frozen desserts, and "oatgurt" are offered. Varieties of oat milk available in the US include the following: barista edition, original, chocolate, full fat, and low-fat oat milk. Oatly also offers a nondairy frozen dessert, similar to an ice cream, in several flavors. Flavors available for purchase in the US include chocolate chip, mint chip, coffee, strawberry, chocolate, vanilla, oat, and salted caramel. Oatly frozen desserts are available in store only, in the United States. Oatgurt, a substitute yoghurt, is made with oats and does not contain any dairy. The product contains active and live cultures. Flavors of oatgurt available in the US include plain, strawberry, peach, black cherry, and mixed berry.

Internationally, Oatly also offers on the go, single-serve beverages packaged in silver containers that resemble cans, but are made of recyclable paper. Varieties include chocolate oat milk, cold brew latte, organic matcha latte, and organic mocha latte. Additionally, both boxed oat drink and boxed chocolate oat drink are available outside the US.

The only nutritional difference between Oatly's original oat milk and barista edition oat milk is fat content. The barista edition contains a slightly higher fat content than the original version (3% versus 1.5%). The higher fat content allows the oat milk to perform better when steamed, frothed, and paired with espresso for coffee drinks, hence the name "barista edition". It also makes for a richer and more pleasant flavor complement to teas in tea lattes and is commonly used as a milk alternative for matcha lattes.

Advertising 

The Danish dairy company Arla Foods produced a series of adverts to discourage people from buying vegan alternatives to cow's milk and used a fake brand 'Pjölk' which was similar to Oatly. In response, Oatly trademarked the fictitious brands Pjölk, Brölk, Sölk, and Trölk and began using them on their packaging.

The Swedish dairy lobby LRF Mjölk successfully sued Oatly for using the phrase "Milk, but made for humans." In response to the lawsuit, Oatly published the text of the lawsuit leading to an increase in sales.

In 2018, Oatly spent £700,000 on advertising in the UK on All 4 and on billboards in train stations in Brixton, King's Cross, Oxford Circus, and Shoreditch using the "Milk, but made for humans" slogan banned in Sweden.

In February 2021, the company advertised during Super Bowl LV. The commercial, called "Wow, No Cow", featured CEO Toni Petersson singing a jingle in an oat field. The ad was originally aired in Sweden in 2014, which got banned due to a lawsuit from LRF Mjölk that sued Oatly for using the phrase "Milk, but made for humans".

Later that month, Oatly launched its first Europe-wide advertising campaign called "Are You Stupid?", showing results from focus group testing, showing people recognising which products do and do not contain dairy, irrespective of packaging, and directing viewers to a petition against "Amendment 171", supported by the European Dairy Association, which seeks to ban non-dairy products from using "dairy-based descriptors" such as "dairy", "creamy", "yoghurt-style dessert" or "does not contain milk" and could be interpreted to ban "packaging designs that call to mind dairy products, such as yoghurt pots or milk cartons" and ban climate impact comparisons. Campaigners — and one focus group member — argued that Amendment 171 would make it harder for the EU to meet its goal of increasing plant-based food consumption. Amendment 171 was approved by majority vote in the European Parliament in October 2020 and went into trilogue negotiations in late January 2021. On 25 May 2021 the EU withdrew Amendment 171, thus allowing plant-based dairy companies to use words like "buttery" or "creamy" to describe their products.

In the beginning of 2022, several Oatly ads were banned by the British Advertising Standards Authority (ASA), a private regulatory body. The ASA did not dispute Oatly's claim that a vegan diet would reduce greenhouse gas emissions. But the ASA found consumers could confuse claims for Oatly Barista Edition with its other products, and that a study comparing the meat and dairy industry to the transportation industry did not compare the two equally.

References 

Vegan cuisine
Food product brands
Oats
Food and drink companies of Sweden
2021 initial public offerings
Companies listed on the Nasdaq
Companies based in Malmö